William Broadhead (September 1815 – 15 March 1879) was a British trade unionist and saw grinder.

Born in Whirlow, Sheffield, Broadhead worked as a saw grinder from childhood, later becoming the landlord of a public house in Owlerton.  He used his income from this business to support saw grinders who found themselves in difficulties, and as a result, was elected General Secretary of the Saw Grinders Union in 1848.  Under his leadership, the union grew in power, raising large sums of money for their members, and disrupting the work of non-union members.

This disruption took several forms, including damaging equipment, sending threatening letters, and even bombings and shootings.  Broadhead never became personally involved in this intimidation, and was able to occupy a prominent position in trade union politics, being elected to an office in the first Sheffield Association of Organised Trades in 1858, and then made Treasurer of the United Kingdom Alliance of Organised Trades in 1866.

As the union's struggle against unorganised labour came to national attention, its actions became known as the "Sheffield Outrages".  Broadhead denied all knowledge, and offered a reward for information.  In November 1866, the Sheffield Association and the London Trades Council asked Parliament to investigate.  Most union members, including Broadhead, were given certificates of immunity, so although Broadhead ultimately confessed to ordering a murder and various other crimes to be committed, he was not convicted of any.  He remained with the union, but was refused his publican's licence.  To avoid public attention, he emigrated to the United States in 1869, but returned the following year to start a new career as a grocer.

References

1815 births
1879 deaths
British trade union leaders
People from Dore
Trade unionists from Sheffield